Branislav Hrnjiček (Serbian Cyrillic: Бранислав Хрњичек; 5 June 1908 – 2 July 1964) was a Serbian football player and manager.

He spent all of his playing career in Belgrade, having played mostly for SK Jugoslavija; the exception being the two seasons he spent playing between 1930 and 1932 with BASK.

He played a total of five matches for the Yugoslavia national football team and scored once. His debut was in a Balkan Cup match on 6 October 1929, against Romania in Bucharest, a 2–1 loss, and his last match was in a friendly against Argentina on 3 August 1930, in Buenos Aires, a 3–1 loss. His only goal was in a match against Bulgaria in a 6–1 win. He was part of the Yugoslav team in the 1930 FIFA World Cup, but didn't play a single match.

After ending his playing career, he worked as a football coach for some period in Israel. He died at 56 years of age, while preparing to continue his coaching career in Germany.
His grandson is Boris Hrnjicek.

References

External links
 Profile at Serbian Federation site

1908 births
1964 deaths
Footballers from Belgrade
Serbian footballers
Yugoslav footballers
Yugoslavia international footballers
1930 FIFA World Cup players
Association football midfielders
SK Jugoslavija players
FK BASK players
Serbian football managers
Yugoslav football managers
FK Željezničar Sarajevo managers